Jacques Blaseus (c.1540–1618) was successively bishop of Namur and bishop of Saint-Omer in the Spanish Netherlands.

Life
Jacques de Blaese, born in Bruges around 1540, came from a poor family and was educated at a charity school in Bruges until his abilities brought him to the attention of generous patrons, who provided him with the means for an education in the humanities. As a youth he joined the Franciscans in Douai, eventually serving as provincial superior of the order in the Low Countries. He was named bishop of Namur by letters patent of Philip II of Spain dated 11 May 1596. The nomination was confirmed by Pope Clement VIII in 1597, and Blaseus was consecrated bishop by the papal nuncio, Ottavio Mirto Frangipani, on 23 November. On 31 December 1598 he delivered a funeral oration for Philip II in the collegiate church of St Gudula (now the cathedral) in Brussels.

Late in the year 1600, the Archdukes Albert and Isabella appointed him bishop of Saint-Omer. He took possession of the new see on 19 April 1601. He died in Saint-Omer on 21 March 1618 and was buried in his cathedral. He bequeathed his library to the church.

References

1618 deaths
Clergy from Bruges
Belgian Franciscans
17th-century Roman Catholic bishops in the Holy Roman Empire
Year of birth uncertain
Bishops of Namur
16th-century Roman Catholic bishops in the Holy Roman Empire